Helen Agcaoili Summers Brown (May 16, 1915January 25, 2011) was a Filipina-American educator and librarian. Brown established the first library in the United States to focus on the Philippines and the Filipino-American experience. She was an educator at the Los Angeles Unified School District for 34 years, where she worked to help Filipino-American children connect with their heritage and educate all students about Filipino culture.

Early life and education

Helen Agcaoili Summers was born in Manila on May 16, 1915. She was the third of seven children born to Trinidad Agcaoili Summers, a Filipina woman, and George R. Summers, an Anglo American man. Her father had emigrated to the Philippines to teach English as part of efforts to establish Western-style schools following the acquisition of the Philippines by the United States through the 1898 Treaty of Paris.

She graduated from Manila Central High School in 1934. Her family moved to Arcadia, California soon afterward, where Helen enrolled in Pasadena City College. After choosing to write a report on the Spanish influence on Manila, Helen found no resources in the college's library or the public library, and completed the assignment using her father's scrapbooks and memorabilia. The experience inspired her to become a lifelong collector of resources about Filipino culture.

Brown transferred to the University of California, Los Angeles, where she earned her bachelor's degree in education (1937) and a master's degree in social work (1939).

She married Bill Brown in 1941; they traveled to Colorado to get married because California's miscegenation laws, then in place, would not permit a mestiza to marry a white man. Brown and her husband both worked in shipyards during World War II. They had four sons.

Work as an educator

Brown worked for the Los Angeles Unified School District (LAUSD) for thirty-four years, retiring in 1974. She held multiple roles in the system, including making home visits as a Pupil Personnel and Attendance Counselor. She also taught third grade at schools within the district.

During her time at LAUSD, she lobbied the district to recognize the specific needs of Filipino-American school children. She also lobbied on behalf of Filipino-American schoolteachers, working to increase the number of teachers and to see them promoted within the system.

Establishing the Filipino American Library

After retiring as a teacher, Brown focused her energy on the collection of materials she had gathered for four decades. The collection became a home library, and in 1985, a church near downtown Los Angeles donated space in their basement for the library to reside. The Pilipino American Reading Room and Library (PARRAL) opened to the public on October 13, 1985. Brown hosted visiting hours two afternoons a week.

In 1988, the Pamana Foundation was established by Helen Brown, Tania Azores, Brad Bagasao, and Ming Menez to encourage interest in Filipino-American culture and history, with the library as a research center. PARRAL was moved to Luzon Plaza in Historic Filipinotown, Los Angeles in March 1994, providing more visibility. The Los Angeles Times described the opening as "a milestone in the history of the local Filipino community." Another relocation in 2000 moved the library to Temple Street and inspired a renaming of the library to the Filipino American Library (FAL). At 6,000 items, including books, pamphlets, photographs, and artifacts, it was the largest collection of Filipino and Filipino-American reading materials in the United States.

A short documentary titled Got Books? was created by Florante Ibanez in 2005 to recognize Brown and the founding of the FAL. In the film, Brown is interviewed by her son and discusses her upbringing in the Philippines as a mestiza.

When the Filipino American Library closed, the collections were distributed to the Echo Park branch of the Los Angeles Public Library and the University of Southern California Libraries. The USC Libraries have digitized materials in the Filipino American Library Collection, including materials written in English, Tagalog, and Ilocano.

Later life and death

Brown and her family lived for over fifty years in Hermosa Beach, California. She spent her last years in an assisted living residence in Hermosa Beach. Brown died there on January 25, 2011.

References

External links
 Got Book? 9-minute video documentary about Brown and the founding of the Filipino American Library (2005)
 Get to know Fil-Am education pioneer Helen Agcaoili Summers 3-minute video about Brown from Balitang America (2020)
 Filipino American Library Collection materials from the USC Digital Library

1915 births
2011 deaths
American librarians
American women educators
American women librarians
American writers of Filipino descent
Filipino emigrants to the United States
Filipino people of American descent
People from Manila
Pasadena City College alumni
University of California, Los Angeles alumni